Stelmachowo  is a village in the administrative district of Gmina Tykocin, within Białystok County, Podlaskie Voivodeship, in north-eastern Poland.

The village has an approximate population of 90.

References

Stelmachowo
Łomża Governorate
Białystok Voivodeship (1919–1939)
Belastok Region